Atwell is a surname. Notable people with the surname include:

Clarence Atwell Jr. (1945–2013), Native American tribal leader and politician
Clive Atwell (born 1988), Guyanese boxer
Hayley Atwell (born 1982), English actress
Hugh Atwell (?–1621), English actor
James Atwell (1946–2020), former Dean of Winchester
Joe Atwell (1919–1988), North American construction investor and builder
John Atwell (engineer) (1911–1999), Scottish engineer
Mal Atwell (born 1936), Australian football player
Philip Atwell, American video director
Robert Atwell (born 1954), Anglican Bishop of Exeter
Roy Atwell (1878–1962), American actor, comedian and composer
Sam Atwell (born 1979), Australian actor
Toby Atwell (1924–2003), American baseball player
Tutu Atwell (born 1999), American football player
William H. Atwell (1869–1969), United States federal judge
Winifred Atwell (1914–1983), pianist born in Trinidad and Tobago
Yvonne Atwell (born 1943), Canadian politician

In fiction:
Douglas Atwell, character in the 1928 musical Present Arms
Miss Atwell, character in Minty Alley

See also
 Attwell, alternate spelling